Clanculus natalensis is a species of sea snail, a marine gastropod mollusk in the family Trochidae, the top snails.

Distribution
This marine species occurs off South Africa and Mozambique.

References

External links
 To World Register of Marine Species

natalensis
Gastropods described in 1993